Nomis is a genus of moths of the family Crambidae.

Species
Nomis albopedalis Motschulsky, 1861
Nomis baibarensis (Shibuya, 1928)
Nomis brunnealis Munroe & Mutuura, 1968

References

Natural History Museum Lepidoptera genus database

Pyraustinae
Crambidae genera